Sõmerpalu is a small borough in Võru County, Estonia. Between 1991–2017, until the administrative reform of Estonian local governments, the small town was the administrative center of Sõmerpalu Parish. As of 2017, it belongs to Võru Parish.

Sõmerpalu manor
The history of the local manor goes back to at least 1544, when there was a fortified manor, a so-called "vassal castle", at approximately the same site as the present-day manor house. During the Livonian War, however, this building was destroyed, and a new manor house was built some time after this. The present house was erected by the family von Moeller in the 1860s in the then-popular neo-Gothic style.

See also
List of palaces and manor houses in Estonia

References

External links
Sõmerpalu Parish 
Sõmerpalu manor at Estonian Manors Portal

Võru Parish
Boroughs and small boroughs in Estonia
Kreis Werro